Two ships of the Royal Navy have been named HMS Polyanthus after the flower:

  was an  sloop of World War I

Royal Navy ship names